Otolaryngologic Clinics of North America is a medical journal that covers the latest trends in patient management and provides a sound basis for choosing treatment options. The journal is published by Elsevier.

Abstracting and indexing 
The journal is abstracted and indexed in:

 Embase
 PubMed/Medline
 BIOSIS Citation Index
 Current Contents - Clinical Medicine
 Web of Science
 Science Citation Index
 Research Alert

According to the Journal Citation Reports, the journal has a 2021 impact factor of 3.346.

References

External links 

 
Elsevier academic journals
English-language journals
Otorhinolaryngology journals
Publications with year of establishment missing
ISSN needed